"Be Without You" is a song by American recording artist Mary J. Blige. It was written by Johnta Austin, Bryan Michael Cox, Jason Perry, and Blige for her seventh studio album, The Breakthrough (2005). Production was helmed by Cox and Young Smoke, while vocal production was overseen by Ron Fair and Blige. It was released as the album's first official single on November 14, 2005.

Ranking among the most played songs on US radio in the year 2006, the single was certified double-platinum by the RIAA in 2007. In March 2017, Billboard ranked "Be Without You" as the most successful R&B/Hip-Hop Song of all time. "Be Without You" is also one of Mary J. Blige's most successful singles to date, peaking at number three on the Billboard Hot 100. The song was nominated for Record of the Year and Song of the Year and won the Best R&B Song and Best Female R&B Vocal Performance categories at the 2007 Grammy Awards.

Background

"Be Without You" is a contemporary R&B and hip hop soul song written in the key of D minor with a tempo of 73 beats per minute. The song follows a chord progression of Dm – Bmaj7 – C – Dm – Gm7 – C – A7, and Blige's vocals span from F3 to D5. It was co-written by Blige along with Bryan-Michael Cox, Jason Perry and Johnta Austin, and co-produced by Cox and Young Smoke. Cox played all instruments, helped by Young Smoke, as well as Ron Fair, who also did the additional vocal arrangements and string arrangements. Additionally, the song features three engineers and was mixed by David Pensado. Cox commented on the production of "Be Without You": "I did the whole track and Jason co-composed the bridge with me, and Johnta wrote the lyrics and the melody. Mary came in and she and I tweaked some of the lines and tightened the record up lyrically to fit her. We threw ideas around, we talked about the track and we came up with concepts."

Music video
The accompanying music video for "Be Without You" was directed by Matthew Rolston and was shot in various New York City locations in October 2005.

Starring Oscar-nominated actor Terrence Howard in the role of Blige's boyfriend the video first aired on November 28, 2005. It peaked on AOL Videos Top 11 on the tenth spot on the January 21, 2006, entering the chart the first time and also the LAUNCH Music Videos Top 100 at the sixth position the same week.  There's also a "Live At Launch Exclusive Performance" available for download from January 2006, which peaked seventieth on the same chart. It won the "Video of the Year" award at the 2006 BET Awards on June 27, 2006, and was nominated for "Best R&B Video" at the 2006 MTV Video Music Awards.

Synopsis
The video begins with a black and white cityscape with Blige standing on top of a building as the song starts playing. Then, the video shifts into a bathroom scene with Blige cleaning out her medicine cabinet. In the first scene, Blige is typing the lyrics on her laptop. The next scene shown in color appears with Blige falling in love with her boyfriend and sleeping with him. Then, the next scene takes place in a kitchen where Blige and her love interest are celebrating dinner with her family. Meanwhile, she is seen in a color scene standing next to a group of candles with the next scene showing her at a red carpet premiere walking out of a limo. Then, Blige and her boyfriend break up after having a fight (as seen in the events at the beginning of the video). After 2 candles begin to melt, the final scene in black and white changes to color with a knock on Blige's door. She opens the door to find her boyfriend on the other side. They embrace at the close of the song.

Chart performance
The single debuted at number 93 on the Billboard Hot 100 and peaked at number three in February 2006, Blige's third highest peak of her career after 2001's "Family Affair" and 1996's "Not Gon' Cry." Moreover, the song became the most successful release in the history of the Hot R&B/Hip-Hop Songs chart (until 2013) when it spent a record 15 consecutive weeks at number one. "Be Without You" topped the U.S. Billboard Hot 100 Airplay chart for nine weeks, and the dance remix has also topped the U.S. Hot Dance Club Play chart. The song broke the record for the longest-running single in the existence of the Hot R&B/Hip-Hop Songs, where it spent a grand total of 75 weeks on that chart.  After its run on the main R&B chart, it moved to the Recurrent R&B Airplay chart.

In the UK, the single only peaked at number 32 on the UK singles chart; however, with the Moto Blanco remix of the song becoming a large club hit in the UK, the song actually managed to hold (to that time) the record for the most weeks on the UK top 75 for a Mary J. Blige single (18 in total). Having proved very popular, the Moto Blanco remix was featured as a B-side in the UK on subsequent singles "MJB Da MVP" and "Enough Cryin'."

Remixes
The official remix was also produced by Bryan-Michael Cox and features former Shady Records rapper Stat Quo.

Covers
Paris Bennett covered the song as a finalist in the Top 5 week of the fifth season of American Idol.
Lil Rounds covered the song in the semifinals for the eighth season of American Idol.
English dance group Booty Luv covered the song for their debut album, Boogie 2Nite.
Smooth jazz saxophonist and musician Eric Darius covered the song from his 2008 album, Goin' All Out.

Track listings and formats
 
 
 US CD single
 "Be Without You" (Kendu Mix)
 "Show Love"
 "Be Without You" (Moto Blanco Vocal Mix)
 "Be Without You" (video)

 UK CD single
 "Be Without You" (Kendu Mix)
 "Be Without You" (Moto Blanco Vocal Mix)
 "Be Without You" (instrumental)
 "Be Without You" (video)
 
 12-inch single
 "Be Without You" (Kendu Mix)
 "Be Without You" (Moto Blanco Vocal Mix)
 "Be Without You" (Moto Blanco Dub)
 "Be Without You" (instrumental)

Charts

Weekly charts

Year-end charts

Certifications

Release history

References

2005 songs
2005 singles
2006 singles
Mary J. Blige songs
Music videos directed by Matthew Rolston
Geffen Records singles
Songs written by Johntá Austin
Songs written by Mary J. Blige
Songs written by Bryan-Michael Cox
Contemporary R&B ballads
2000s ballads